LINE-1 type transposase domain containing 1, also known as L1TD1, is an RNA-binding protein that involved with self-renewal of undifferentiated human embryonic stem cells and cancer cell proliferation.  L1TD1 has been reported to associate with the development of several cancers.

References

Further reading